The 24th New York Infantry Regiment was an infantry regiment in the Army of the Potomac during the American Civil War from the state of New York. It was a part of the famed Eastern Iron Brigade under Colonel Walter Phelps Jr.

The 24th was mustered into service on July 2, 1861, and mustered out of service May 29, 1863. Col. Timothy Sullivan commanded the regiment first, which was organized in Elmira, New York. It originally enlisted soldiers for two-year enlistments and later received 3-year men, who were later folded into the 76th New York Volunteer Infantry. Samuel L. Beardsley commanded the regiment in the Battle of Fredericksburg and the Battle of Chancellorsville. "During its service the regiment lost by death, killed in action, 5 officers, 63 enlisted men; of wounds received in action, 1 officer, 22 enlisted men; of disease and other causes, I officer, 30 enlisted men; total, 7 officers, 115 enlisted men; aggregate, 122; of whom 2 enlisted men died in the hands of the enemy." https://dmna.ny.gov/ states. Some members of the 24th transferred to a new regiment the 24th New York Cavalry.

See also
 List of New York Civil War regiments

References
State of New York Civil War Records Website
https://dmna.ny.gov/historic/reghist/civil/infantry/24thInf/24thInfMain.htm
https://www.nps.gov/frsp/learn/historyculture/order-of-battle-fredericksburg-left-grand-division.htm
Eastern Iron Brigade
Infantry 024
1861 establishments in New York (state)
Military units and formations established in 1861
Military units and formations disestablished in 1863
1863 disestablishments in New York (state)